Santa Cruz is a settlement in the eastern part of the island of Santiago, Cape Verde. It is part of the municipality of Santa Cruz. It is located 2 km south of Cancelo and 3 km west of Pedra Badejo, on the national road to Tarrafal (EN1-ST02). In 2010 its population was 2,019.

References

Villages and settlements in Santiago, Cape Verde
Santa Cruz, Cape Verde